Love County Airport  was a public-use airport located two nautical miles northwest of the central business district of Marietta, a city in Love County, Oklahoma, United States.

Facilities and aircraft 
Love County Airport resided  at an elevation of 900 feet (274 m) above mean sea level. It had one runway designated 17/35 with a turf surface measuring 3,250 by 35 feet (991 x 11 m).

References

External links 
 Aerial photo as of 31 January 1995 from USGS The National Map

Defunct airports in Oklahoma
Buildings and structures in Love County, Oklahoma